The SSC Tuatara  is a sports car designed, developed and manufactured by American automobile manufacturer SSC North America (formerly Shelby SuperCars Inc.). The car is the successor to the Ultimate Aero and is the result of a design collaboration between Jason Castriota and SSC.

Design and development 

SSC began working on the development of the successor of the SSC Ultimate Aero in 2011. The new car named the Tuatara was previewed in concept form at the 2011 Pebble Beach Concours d'Elegance. In August 2018, seven years after the debut of the concept, the production version of the Tuatara was shown to the general public. Designed by ex-Pininfarina designer Jason Castriota, the car takes inspiration from the aerospace industry.

The Tuatara is named after the reptile, found only in New Zealand, known for having the fastest molecular evolution of any living animal.

Interior 
The interior contains leather and Alcantara upholstery and the functions of the car are controlled through a touch screen located on the center console. There is a configurable instrument panel behind the steering wheel displaying important information about the car's status along with a  speedometer. The car uses a camera system instead of traditional side-view mirrors.

Exterior 
The car has a carbon-fiber body construction with aluminum crumple zones and incorporates active aerodynamics.

Performance 

SSC has partnered with Nelson Racing Engines to build the engine, Linder Power Systems for engine sub-assembly fabrication and Automac for the production of the 7-speed automated manual transmission. The transmission was later revealed to be a 7-speed automated manual manufactured by CIMA. The car has the following driving modes: "Sport", "Track" and "Lift". The Lift mode is designed to protect the underbody of the car while driving over speed bumps or driveways.

Production 
The Tuatara is produced at a purpose-built facility in Richland, Washington, and production is limited to 100 cars.

World record attempts 

British racing driver Oliver Webb piloted the car. Independent analysis by Youtuber Shmee150 subsequently challenged the record's accuracy. In a video on the SSC North America YouTube channel uploaded October 30, 2020, SSC's founder Jerod Shelby stated that the run had been ruined after they started seeing some doubts, and the only way to fix them was to re-run the top speed in the near future.

A second top speed run was attempted in Florida on December 12-13, 2020, but the car was unable to exceed  due to mechanical problems.

American dentist and entrepreneur Larry Caplin, owner of the car, piloted it during the run, which was verified with multiple satellite tracking systems from Racelogic, Life Racing, Garmin, and IMRA.

In April 2021 while traveling back to Florida to reattempt the speed record, the Tuatara was damaged after its trailer flipped over in high winds in Utah.

This was verified by two Racelogic VBOX GNSS and a Life Racing GPS speed measurement systems, as well as a Racelogic technician on hand.

Model variants 
In May, 2020, SSC North America announced a soft reveal of two Tuatara variants that focused on track abilities.

Tuatara Striker 
The Tuatara Striker features additional aerodynamic components that increases downforce for track handling.

Tuatara Aggressor 
The Tuatara Aggressor has the same body style as the Striker, but allows the customer to choose from non-road legal options, such as racing seats and a  engine upgrade.

Specifications

"Little Brother" project 
CEO Jerod Shelby has shared limited information about a "Little Brother" supercar in early development that will decrease the price-point of a Tuatara-related vehicle to make it available to a larger market.

See also 
 List of production cars by power output

References

External links 

 

Sports cars
Coupés
Rear mid-engine, rear-wheel-drive vehicles
SSC Tuatara Concept
Cars introduced in 2020